Temptation is a 1934 British-French musical comedy film directed by Max Neufeld and starring Frances Day, Stewart Rome and Anthony Hankey. It was made at the Joinville Studios in Paris with sets designed by the art director Jacques Colombier. It is the English-language version of Antonia.

Cast
 Frances Day as Antonia Palmay  
 Stewart Rome as Paul Palmay  
 Anthony Hankey as William Parker  
 Peggy Simpson as Piri  
 Mickey Brantford as Johnny  
 Lucy Beaumont as Headmistress  
 Billy Watts as Gus  
 C. Denier Warren as Director  
 Effie Atherton as Vera Hanka  
 Molly Hamley-Clifford as Maresa  
 Alfred Rode and His Tzigane Orchestra  as themselves

References

Bibliography
Low, Rachael. Filmmaking in 1930s Britain. George Allen & Unwin, 1985.
Wood, Linda. British Films, 1927–1939. British Film Institute, 1986.

External links
 

1934 films
1934 musical comedy films
British musical comedy films
French musical comedy films
Films shot at Joinville Studios
Films directed by Max Neufeld
British multilingual films
French multilingual films
British black-and-white films
Films scored by Paul Abraham
English-language French films
1934 multilingual films
1930s British films
1930s French films